Fort Tenedos was a large earth-walled fort constructed on the Zulu side of the Tugela River in January 1879, opposite Fort Pearson, to support the British at the start of the Anglo-Zulu War.

Construction 
On 2 December 1878 Captain W. R. C. Wynne embarked in command of the 2nd Field Company of the Royal Engineers for Natal, part of the small number of reinforcements sent to the colony ahead of the Anglo-Zulu War of 1879. The company joined the first column under Colonel Charles Knight Pearson at the mouth of the Tugela River on 12 January and the following day crossed the river with them. In the presence of the Zulu, Wynne with his company of Royal Engineers, assisted by the line, laid out and built Fort Tenedos on the left (Zulu) bank of the Lower Tugela. The earthwork fort, large enough to shelter the entire column and a quantity of stores, was completed between 13 and 17 January. It was named Fort Tenedos after the British warship , anchored off the mouth of the Tugela. Her crew formed part of the Naval Brigade.

Defences 
The fort's armament consisted of two guns from the Royal Artillery, two 7-pounder guns with the Naval Brigade, and a Gatling gun. Local British units consisted of the 91st Highlanders, Natal Hussars, the Durban Mounted Rifles, Alexandra Mounted Rifles, Stanger Mounted Rifles, and the Victorian Mounted Rifles. There were also some 2,200 Natal Natives formed into two battalions of the 2nd Regiment, Natal Native Contingent, and a company of Durnford's Natal Native Pioneer Corps. These men were recruited from local African tribes hostile to the Zulus.

References

Sources 
 Laband, John (2009). Historical Dictionary of the Zulu Wars. The Scarecrow Press, Inc. .
 
 The Illustrated London News. No. 2073.—Vol. LXXIV. 8 March 1879. p. 219.
Attribution:

Further reading 

 Laband, J. P. C. (June 1983). "British Fieldworks of the Zulu Campaign of 1879, with Special Reference to Fort Eshowe". Military History Journal, 6(3). The South African Military History Society.
 "Fort Tenedos". 1879zuluwar.com. Retrieved 30 November 2022.

Forts of the Anglo-Zulu War
Tugela River
History of KwaZulu-Natal
Former military buildings and structures
Tenedos